Areia is a genus of cheirurid phacopid trilobite which existed during the Ordovician in what is now the Czech Republic. It was described by Barrande in 1872, and the type and only species is Areia bohemica.

References

External links
 Areia at the Paleobiology Database

Fossils of the Czech Republic
Cheiruridae
Ordovician trilobites
Fossil taxa described in 1868